Michael "Mike" H. Hooper (February 7, 1850 – December 1, 1917) was an American professional baseball player who played in three games for the Baltimore Marylands during the  baseball season, his only playing time at the major league level. 
Previously he was an outfielder for the Maryland club at least 1868 to 1870, when he led the team in runs scored all three seasons. 
Maryland was one of the pioneer pro clubs when the National Association first permitted professional members in 1869.

Hooper was born in Baltimore, Maryland and died there at the age of 67.

Sources

Wright, Marshall (2000). The National Association of Base Ball Players, 1857-1870. Jefferson, NC: McFarland & Co. . Pages 199, 250, 304.

Baseball players from Baltimore
Baltimore Marylands (NABBP) players
Baltimore Marylands players
1850 births
1917 deaths
19th-century baseball players